Prime Cuts is a compilation released by American crossover thrash band Suicidal Tendencies. It was released in 1997 on Epic Records.

Background
Prime Cuts contains songs from each of Suicidal Tendencies' major label albums from How Will I Laugh Tomorrow When I Can't Even Smile Today through Suicidal for Life (except for their 1989 album Controlled by Hatred/Feel Like Shit...Déjà Vu), as well as two brand new tracks, "Berserk!" and "Feeding the Addiction", and two reworked tracks from their 1987 album Join the Army, "Join the New Army" and "Go Skate! (Possessed To Skate '97)". Prime Cuts also includes the re-recorded versions of "Institutionalized" and "I Saw Your Mommy" from the band's 1993 album Still Cyco After All These Years.

Track listing

References

Suicidal Tendencies albums
1997 greatest hits albums
Epic Records compilation albums